La Casa Blanca (Spanish for 'white house'), also known as the Efrén Bernier Residence, is a Spanish creole-style historic residence building located at 17 José I. Quintón Street in Coamo Pueblo (downtown Coamo), the historical and administrative center of the Puerto Rican municipality of Coamo. The house dates to 1865 with further modifications made in 1874. The building was added to the United States National Register of Historic Places on April 28, 1992.

References 

Houses completed in 1865
Blanca (Coamo, Puerto Rico)
Coamo, Puerto Rico
1865 establishments in Puerto Rico
Government buildings on the National Register of Historic Places in Puerto Rico
Creole architecture